Iran Helicopter Support and Renovation Company (IHSRC) (abbreviated as , PANHA) is an Iranian helicopter manufacturing company.

History
Following the purchase by Iran of some Italian helicopters from Agusta Company, it became important to establish a plant for support and repair these helicopters. This plant was named Iran Joint Helicopter Industry. Later on, after purchase of some large number of helicopters from Bell, planning for expansion of this plant to support the new fleet started. Part of this expansion was to create three major sections.

1. (NMP)  Repair and Maintenance Centre
2. (HDMC) Main Fleet Repair Centre
3. (NICP) Logistics and Support Centre

After Iran’s revolution in 1979, US embargo on Iran, and the start of the Iran-Iraq war, PANHA started its operations with a goal of supporting and maintaining helicopters in the war. After a few years, they became self-sufficient in repair and maintenance of all of Iran's military helicopters. In 1986, following this success, their task of repair, maintenance, and support expanded to other organizations like communication, oil, Red Cross of Iran, and power plants.

Currently, this organization repairs and maintains ten different kinds of military and non-military helicopters in sixteen different models. In 1994, experts at PANHA Company completed the structure of their first helicopter called Shabaviz. After this, they received their first official permit to start manufacturing commercial helicopters. PANHA has been instrumental in reverse-engineering helicopters, their upgrades and servicing the large fleet of Iranian helicopters.

Duties
 Repair and maintain nine kinds of helicopters in fifteen different models. (Bell 205, Bell 206, Bell 212, Bell 214, CH, RH, SH, 412, Mil 17)
 Body structure and upgrading helicopters
 Design and configuration of variety of helicopters windows and glasses
 Design and manufacturing fixtures

Products

Helicopters
Panha 2091 - based on Bell AH-1 SuperCobra
Panha Shabaviz 2-75 - based on Bell 204/205
Panha Shabaviz 2061 - based on Bell 206
Homa - The twin-engine helicopter can seat 14 people and fly in different weathers.
 Sorena (helicopter)

See also
Iran Aviation Industries Organization
Iranian Military Industry

References

External links

Iran Aerospace research and industries - Helicopter industries
IHSRC - Iranian Helicopter Support and Renewal Company (2014)

Aircraft manufacturers of Iran
Helicopter manufacturers
Iranian brands
Defence companies of Iran
Ministry of Defence and Armed Forces Logistics of the Islamic Republic of Iran